James Gordon (October 31, 1739 – January 17, 1810) was an Irish-born American merchant, soldier, and politician.

He was born in Killead, County Antrim, Ireland, and left in 1758, settling in Schenectady, New York. From that base and from Detroit, Michigan, he traded with various Native American tribes. He owned slaves.

He served as militia lieutenant colonel in the American Revolution. 
In the 1780 British raid, known as "The Burning of the Valleys", he was captured and taken to Quebec, where he was held until he managed to escape in 1783.

During and after the war, first in 1777, held various legislative offices, serving in both houses of the state legislature, and representing the state in the United States House of Representatives from 1791 until 1795.

Gordon was married to Mary Ball, daughter of  Rev. Eliphalet Ball, the founder of Ballston, New York.

Gordon Creek, in the Town of Ballston, is named for him.

References

External links
Biographic sketch at U.S. Congress website

1739 births
1810 deaths
People from County Antrim
Kingdom of Ireland emigrants to the Thirteen Colonies
People of the Province of New York
American people of Scotch-Irish descent
Pro-Administration Party members of the United States House of Representatives from New York (state)
Members of the New York State Assembly
New York (state) state senators
American slave owners
People from Ballston, New York
Politicians from Schenectady, New York
Military personnel from Schenectady, New York
Burials in Saratoga County, New York